Seaview Cottage, also known as Mary Drummond's Cottage, is a building situated on Bayside Boulevard at the entrance to the Bayside Estate in Drummond Cove approximately  north of Geraldton in the Mid West region of Western Australia.

Seaview Cottage was built by John Nicol Drummond, a pioneer pastoralist. The small two roomed stone cottage has been restored from a ruin and faces west with both a front and a rear verandah.

History

Some time after John Drummond was imprisoned for the unlawful wounding of tenant farmer John Fisher, Mary Drummond moved from White Peak Station to Seaview with her adopted daughter Rosie. Subsequently, John also lived at the cottage until his death in 1906 at the age of 90. Some time after John's death Mary moved to Subiaco. The cottage stood vacant for some years and deteriorated into a ruin. The cottage was restored as part of the Bayside Estate development and opened by Kevin Minson, MLA in 1995.

References

External links
 https://www.cgg.wa.gov.au/Profiles/cgg/Assets/ClientData/Document-Centre/Planning/Heritage/Greenough/Greenough_Heritage_Place_Number-173-MCH127012.pdf

Heritage places of Western Australia
Mid West (Western Australia)